Man in the Attic is a 1953 mystery film directed by Hugo Fregonese. It was released in the United States on December 23 by Twentieth Century Fox. The movie is based on the 1913 novel The Lodger by Marie Belloc Lowndes, which fictionalizes the Jack the Ripper killings, and was previously filmed by Alfred Hitchcock in 1927, by Maurice Elvey in 1932, by John Brahm in 1944, and subsequently by David Ondaatje in 2009.

Plot summary

The story takes place in London, 1888. On the third night of the Jack the Ripper killings, Mr Slade, a research pathologist, arrives quite late at the home of Mr and Mrs Harley, looking to rent a room.  Slade rents out a room and an attic, which he says he needs for his research work.  Mrs Harley notices that Slade acts in a strange manner, for example turning several pictures of actresses to the wall, saying that he can feel their eyes on him. He also mentions that he is usually out late at night working, but he never explains what his research involves.

Mrs Harley's niece, Lily Bonner, arrives to stay at the house shortly afterwards; she is a beautiful stage actress and singer, recently returned from a successful stage production in Paris. Slade leaves the house for the evening, wearing an Ulster coat and carrying a small black bag, and meets Lily before her opening night in London.  At the theatre an old colleague of Lily's, Annie Rowley (who has fallen on hard times), goes to see her backstage, but she is later murdered by the Ripper, and Inspector Warwick, who is investigating the murders, informs Lily and tells her that the suspect was seen wearing an Ulster coat and a small black bag.  The next morning Warwick goes to see Lily again to ask a few questions, and Slade appears and gives some unorthodox opinions regarding the Ripper and says that he feels the police will never catch him.  Mrs Harley's suspicions are further aroused when she smells burning coming from Slade's attic room, and she is convinced that he is the killer when she discovers that Slade had been burning his black bag; however Mr Harley remains unconvinced.

Lily is attracted to Slade, and he tells her that his mother was also an actress but also that, although she was beautiful, she was also evil and that he both loved and hated her.  She behaved in an adulterous manner and his father became an alcoholic after she left him, and she ended her life as a 'woman of the streets' (i.e., a prostitute) and died on the streets in Whitechapel. Slade shows Lily a picture of his mother.  Inspector Warwick then arrives to take Lily to the Black Museum, and Slade decides to join them, much to Warwick's displeasure.  At the Museum, Slade makes numerous derisive comments about the gruesome nature of the exhibits, although he seems to take a particular interest in the five pictures on the wall of the five Ripper victims, before again telling Warwick that the police will never catch the Ripper.

That same evening, yet another woman is murdered and later Slade is seen washing his hands in the river.  During the night, Lily is woken and goes downstairs to find Slade burning some items of clothing, including his Ulster coat, which appears to have blood stains on it, although Slade claims that he spilled some solution on the coat and it might be contaminated.

Meanwhile Warwick checks out Slade's credentials at the University hospital, and is told that Slade is involved in research and works very late hours.  Lily asks Slade to meet her backstage at the theatre that evening, but before that Warwick decides to see if Slade's right thumbprint matches one left by the Ripper at the scene of one of his crimes, and enlists Mr Harley's help to search Slade's room.  Warwick discovers the picture of Slade's mother in a drawer, but Lily catches them and complains to Warwick that he is harassing an innocent man.  Warwick later tries to match the fingerprint, but his assistant notices the picture of Slade's mother and realises that it is Anne Lawrence, the Ripper's first victim, whose picture is on the wall of the Museum.

By this time Slade has gone to the theatre to see the show, but he observes all the lustful looks on the faces of many of the men in the audience as they watch Lily dancing, and becomes agitated, and when he goes to see her backstage he tells her that he hates other men looking at her in such a manner and begs her to go away with him somewhere, but when she resists he pulls a knife out of his pocket and prepares to cut her throat, but he cannot carry out the act, dropping the knife and escaping out of a window.  The police, including Warwick, pursue Slade through Whitechapel, but Slade evades them and appears to drown himself in the river; however, despite Warwick and other officers searching for him in the river his body is not found and the possibility is left open that he may have escaped alive.

Cast 

 Jack Palance as Slade
 Constance Smith as Lily Bonner
 Byron Palmer as Insp. Paul Warwick
 Frances Bavier as Helen Harley
 Rhys Williams as William Harley
 Sean McClory as Constable No. 1
 Leslie Bradley as Constable No. 2
 Tita Phillips as Daisy
 Lester Matthews as Chief Insp. Melville
 Harry Cording as Detective Sgt. Bates
 Lisa Daniels as Mary Lenihan
 Lilian Bond as Annie Rowley
 Isabel Jewell as Katy
 Noble Chissell as Theatre Patron (uncredited)

See also
 Jack the Ripper in fiction

External links
 
 
 
 
 
  Creative Commons Licensed (Public Domain).

1953 films
1950s historical films
American historical films
American mystery films
Film noir
Films based on works by Marie Adelaide Belloc Lowndes
Films set in London
Films about Jack the Ripper
American serial killer films
20th Century Fox films
Films set in 1888
Films directed by Hugo Fregonese
Films scored by Hugo Friedhofer
American black-and-white films
1950s mystery films
Historical mystery films
1950s English-language films
1950s American films